Nicktoons (or simply called "Toons" since 2016) is a German pay television channel owned by Paramount Networks EMEAA.

History
Nicktoons was launched in December 2007 as Nick Premium. Unlike the US version of Nicktoons, it had TeenNick shows and some of the 1990s shows on the network.

In 2009, Nickelodeon announced that Nick Premium would be renamed as Nicktoons. Nick Premium signed off at 6:04am when the Nick Premium was rebranded as Nicktoons. Some of the programs were dropped from the network after Nicktoons was launched. The network is always 24 hours a day.
in 1 march 2012 NickToons Germany is merged with Nicktoons (European TV channel)

On 30 June 2014, Sky Deutschland dropped Nicktoons from its platform. No reason was given for the decision. Sky, though, stresses in the statement that its focus lies on the expansion of its HD proposition. Nicktoons, however, had only been available in standard definition (SD). Nicktoons is remain available in Germany on the cable networks of Unitymedia and Kabel BW and within the mobile TV offering of Deutsche Telekom among other carriage partners.

On 1 April 2020, the channel returned on Sky Deutschland, as a replacement for Disney XD which closed down in Germany the same day.

Programming

Current Programming

 The Adventures of Kid Danger
 ALVINNN!!! and the Chipmunks
 Avatar: The Last Airbender
 Back at the Barnyard
 Big Nate
 Breadwinners
 The Barbarian and the Troll
 The Casagrandes
 Fanboy & Chum Chum
 The Fairly OddParents
 It's Pony
 Kamp Koral: SpongeBob's Under Years
 Kung Fu Panda: Legends of Awesomeness
 Lego City Adventures
 The Legend of Korra
 The Loud House
 Middlemost Post
 The Mighty B!
 Ollie's Pack
 The Penguins of Madagascar
 Rainbow Butterfly Unicorn Kitty
 Rise of the Teenage Mutant Ninja Turtles
 Rugrats (1991)
 Rugrats (2021)
 Sanjay and Craig
 SpongeBob SquarePants
 The Smurfs (2021)
 Teenage Mutant Ninja Turtles
 T.U.F.F. Puppy (2010-2018: 2021–present)
 Winx Club

Former programming 

 Aaahh!!! Real Monsters
 Action League Now!
 The Adventures of Jimmy Neutron, Boy Genius
 All Grown Up!
 The Angry Beavers
 As Told by Ginger
 Beyblade Burst
 Beyblade: Metal Fury
 Beyblade: Metal Fusion
 Beyblade: Metal Masters
 Beyblade: Shogun Steel
 Bunsen Is a Beast
 CatDog
 Catscratch
 ChalkZone
 Danny Phantom
 Dorg Van Dango
 Doug
 El Tigre: The Adventures of Manny Rivera
 Get Blake!
 Go, Diego, Go!
 Harvey Beaks Hey Arnold! Invader Zim Johnny Test KaBlam! Kappa Mikey Monsters vs. Aliens Monsuno Mr. Meaty My Life as a Teenage Robot Mysticons Pig Goat Banana Cricket Planet Sheen Rabbids Invasion The Ren & Stimpy Show Ricky Sprocket: Showbiz Boy RoboRoach Robot and Monster Rocket Monkeys Rocket Power Rocko's Modern Life Tak and the Power of Juju ToonMarty Totally Spies! Transformers: Prime Tiny Toon Adventures Wayside Welcome to the Wayne The Wild Thornberrys Winx Club The X's Yakkity Yak Yu-Gi-Oh!''

See also
Nickelodeon (Germany)
Nick Jr. (Germany)
Nicktoons (TV channel)

References

External links

Nicktoons (TV network)
Children's television networks
Television channels and stations established in 2007
Television stations in Berlin
2007 establishments in Germany
Television stations in Austria